24-Epibrassinolide is a type of brassinosteroid, a natural occurring plant hormone. It was first discovered 1979 as a growth promoting substance in rape pollen, and was subsequently discovered in many other plant organs. 24-Epibrassinolide is essential for proper plant development 
growth and development, is involved in the regulation of cell elongation and division, and has been shown to improve plant functions in salt- and nickel-stressed environments, as well as increasing enzyme activity. It is sold commercially as a white powder for use in plant culture.

References 

Plant hormones